Mountain West Medical Center is a 44-bed hospital in Tooele, Utah, with 38 active, 32 allied and 41 courtesy members of the Medical Staff.

This hospital is an Accredited Chest Pain, Stroke Receiving Facility, and Designated Trauma Center.

Services offered include 24-hour Emergency Department; Med/Surg Unit; Intensive Care; Cardiology; Cardiopulmonary Services; Imaging Services with CT, MRI, X-Ray, Nuclear Medicine, Mammography, Ultrasound, QCT Bone Density; General Surgery, Laboratory, Obstetrics & Gynecology; Physical and Occupational Therapy; Orthopedics; Tele-Stroke, Tele-Neuro; Tele-NICU; Urology; and EMS.

References

Hospitals in Utah
Buildings and structures in Tooele County, Utah